Louis-Antoine-Augustin Pavy (1805–1866) was a French Roman Catholic priest. He served as the second Bishop of Algiers from 1846 to 1866. He attempted to convert the Arabs to Catholicism. He denounced socialism, rampant among French colonists, as the devil.

Early life
Louis-Antoine-Augustin Pavy was born on March 13, 1805.

Career
Pavy was ordained as a priest in 1829. He served as the second Bishop of Algiers from 1846 to 1866. During his tenure, he was responsible for the construction of Notre Dame d'Afrique in Algiers.

Like his predecessor, he attempted to convert the Arabs to Catholicism. His 1850 request to evangelise the Arabs in villages across the Constantine Province was denied by the Minister of War, who feared they would feel disrespected. Undaunted, he gave speeches denouncing Islam from his pulpit in Algiers.

Meanwhile, Pavy made sure to cater to the French colonists who lived in Algiers. He was especially fearful of their growing adherence to socialism, which he compared to the devil.

In 1863, Pavy suggested that it was easier to preach in small towns than large cities, where spiritualism had become a problem. However, he did not see freemasonry as mutually incompatible with Catholicism.

Death
Pavy died on July 16, 1866, at the age of 61.

Works

Further reading

References

1805 births
1866 deaths
People from Roanne
Christian critics of Islam
French Roman Catholic bishops in Africa
19th-century French Roman Catholic bishops
French Roman Catholic missionaries
Roman Catholic missionaries in Algeria
19th-century Roman Catholic bishops in Africa
Roman Catholic bishops of Algiers